Deulpota is an archaeological site located beside the Hooghly river, in the Diamond Harbour II CD block in the Diamond Harbour subdivision of the South 24 Parganas district in the Indian state of West Bengal.

Geography

Location
It has an elevation of 7m above mean sea level.

Note: The map alongside presents some of the notable locations in the subdivision. All places marked in the map are linked in the larger full screen map.

Excavations
According to the District Census Handbook, South 24 Parganas Deulpota  on the bank of river Hooghly is an important archaeological site. “Excavations in this place have been initiated back in 1963-64, 1964-65 and 1972-73 and variety of artefacts from Gupta ages and early medieval period have been found. The items include fine terracotta pottery, jewellery made of precious and semiprecious stones, silver and copper coins, female figurines including famed Yakshini idol, Gajalakshmi Plaque, burnt polished and unpolished earthen ware, ceramic pottery etc.”

According to Sharmi Chakraborty, Centre for archaeological Studies and Training, Eastern India, pottery including rouletted ware of the Sunga  Kushana period have been found.

References

Archaeological sites in West Bengal
Tourist attractions in South 24 Parganas district